Manouchehr Yazdi is an Iranian teacher and pan-Iranist politician who served as a member of parliament from 1975 to 1979. Yazdi is a senior Pan-Iranist Party member. He resigned from Resurgence Party in June 1978.

References 

Pan-Iranist Party politicians
Rastakhiz Party politicians
1939 births
Living people
Iranian schoolteachers
People from Ardakan
Members of the 24th Iranian Majlis
Iranian nationalists